Julia Brown is an American indie pop band from Baltimore, Maryland.

History
Julia Brown began in early 2013 after the break up of the band Teen Suicide, with the release of their debut studio album to be close to you via Birdtapes. They would feature on a split with Modern Baseball and Old Grey the same year and toured throughout the year until their last concert in October, and the band fell inactive as Sam and Torts reformed Teen Suicide with J2 on guitar soon after.

In 2014, Julia Brown released their second studio album independently (and on Joy Void Recordings in 2016), titled An Abundance of Strawberries.

In 2018, a compilation, An Abundance of BSides & Shit, was released on the group's Bandcamp page. In May 2021, the previous compilation was rereleased as An Abundance of B-sides, which contains one additional song, "Closing, On A Roof (Acoustic Demo)".

In December 2021, Ray stated in an Instagram post that no further projects would ever be released under the Julia Brown name.

Band members
 Sam Ray – lead vocals, lead guitar (2013–2014)
 Dan "DC" Collins – rhythm guitar, keyboards, bass (2013)
 Alec "Torts" Simke – bass, keyboards, backing vocals (2013–2014)
 John "J2" Toohey – drums (2013–2014)
 Caroline White – viola, backing vocals (2013–2014)

Timeline

Discography
Studio albums
to be close to you (2013, Birdtapes)
An Abundance of Strawberries (2014, Self-released; 2016, Joy Void Recordings)
An Abundance of B-sides (2021, Free Palestine) 

Singles
"Library" B/W "I Wanna Be a Witch" (2013)

References

Indie pop groups from Maryland
Musical groups established in 2013
Musical groups from Baltimore
2013 establishments in Maryland